is a roguelike video game in the Pokémon Mystery Dungeon series developed by Spike Chunsoft, published by The Pokémon Company and distributed by Nintendo for the Nintendo 3DS handheld game console. Like its predecessors, players control a human who has awoken as a Pokémon in a world filled entirely by Pokémon and must travel through dungeons, completing missions and battling enemies. The game was released in Japan on September 17, 2015; in North America on November 20, 2015; in Europe on February 19, 2016; and in Australia on February 20, 2016;

Gameplay
Like its predecessor, Super Mystery Dungeon is a dungeon-crawling rogue-like role-playing game featuring 3D characters and environments. Players assume the role of one of 20 Pokémon (which include all 18 starting Pokémon from all six main series generations, along with Pikachu and Riolu), who is joined by a partner, chosen out of the remaining 19 Pokémon, who accompany them in their journey through procedurally-generated dungeons filled with enemies and traps as they help stop a major crisis and save the Pokémon world. The game features all 720 released Pokémon at the time of release.

Plot

Serene Village 
The player wakes up transformed into a Pokémon and only remembering that they used to be a human. When they are suddenly attacked by a group of Beheeyem, a friendly Nuzleaf helps them escape, gives them shelter in Serene Village, and enrolls them in a school for young Pokémon. There, they meet their partner, who dreams of joining the Expedition Society but has become the town pariah due to his overeager nature. Taking advantage of the player not knowing the area, school bullies Pancham and Shelmet trick the player (and the partner, to their chagrin) to enter a mine owned by a Gabite, but the local Drilbur defuse the situation before it gets out of control.

Several days later, the other kids ask the player where they're from, having ascertained that they can't feasibly be Nuzleaf's kid. Not wanting to hide the truth, the player reveals what they remember, but Pancham gets everyone (except the partner and the school principal) to think they're a pathological liar looking for attention. The next day, Nuzleaf's neighbor, Roselia, arrives at the school looking for her daughter Budew, who's disappeared without any real explanation. Recalling a conversation they had with the partner's father about a special honey that Budew overheard, the player and partner rush to a nearby meadow and save her, winning the respect of their classmates and the town. That night, the partner sympathizes with the player's outsider status and gives them one of the Harmony Scarves he has as a sign of friendship.

They eventually meet Ampharos, a member of the Expedition Society who gives them a Connection Orb and names them junior Expedition Society members. After saving Pancham and Shelmet from a group of Litwick who came to town to feed on their fears, Nuzleaf informs the pair that he wants them to join him to explore Revelation Mountain, a local mountain range the town has guarded for years with no reason why. However, the Beheeyem are spotted outside the village, forcing the player and partner to flee to Lively Town, the site of the Expedition Society headquarters.

Lively Town and the Expedition Society 
Upon arriving, Ampharos inducts them into the Expedition Society and introduces them to the other members: explorers Archen, Bunnelby, Buizel, archaeologist Mawile, astronomer Jirachi, communications officer Dedenne, and cook Swirlix. After a few days of work, Archen invites them to a trip to the Air Continent, where they discover that a malicious entity has been turning Pokémon to stone. The Society initially assumes Entei is involved after Latios and Latias are found turned to stone, but when the player and partner inexplicably evolve to their final forms and defeat him, they realize he was only investigating the current events.

A few days later, the entity confronts Entei. Although the Society is unable to prevent Entei from being turned to stone, they find evidence that implies that Krookodile, a local thug, is the culprit. When it is found that a dungeon called the Prehistoric Ruins may help them find more answers, the Society initially intends to go, but the player and partner hear that Krookodile is headed towards Serene Village and leave with Archen to intercept him. Nuzleaf meets up with them and informs them that Krookodile was heading up Revelation Mountain and joins the chase. At the top, the group discovers a sealed spring that can return petrified Pokémon to normal. They confront Krookodile, but Krookodile reveals that Nuzleaf paid him to go to Revelation Mountain. Nuzleaf reveals himself to be the culprit behind the Pokémon turning to stone and, along with the legendary Pokémon Yveltal, petrifies the player, partner, Archen, Suicune and Raikou, dries out the spring water, and begin attacking Pokémon around the world. Ampharos, Jirachi, and Espurr manage to survive while everyone else in Serene Village and Lively Town are turned to stone.

Escaping the Voidlands and going to the Tree of Life 
During this time, the player wakes up in a world called the Voidlands and is reunited with most of the Society. As they try to find a way back to their world, they discover that the planet's life source, the Tree of Life, was once pulled toward the sun by the entity, now known as Dark Matter, but was stopped by 'the alignment of the stars'.  However, they are attacked by manifestations of the Voidlands' darkness. Raikou, Entei, and Suicune save the player, partner, and Mawile, but the others are incapacitated. They make their way up Reverse Mountain, the only way out of the Voidlands, but the battle at the top is so fierce that the player and partner's allies have to sacrifice themselves to let them escape.

The player and partner return to the Society headquarters where they reunite with Espurr, but are confronted by an escaped Beheeyem, who informs them that Dark Matter feeds on the negativity of others and can possess Pokémon. He also mentions that he believes the Tree of Life to be in the deepest part of the Prehistoric Ruins. He leads the player and partner to the ruins, but when they reach the depths, they realize that Nuzleaf, anticipating Beheeyem's betrayal, lied about the Tree's true location. Nuzleaf reveals that Beheeyem was responsible for the player's memory loss, and Espurr is revealed to be a double agent for Nuzleaf. Nuzleaf then tries using the room's energy to attempt to send the player to the deepest part of the Voidlands. Ampharos, Jirachi, and Celebi intervene and transport the player, partner and Espurr, who was actually a double agent for Ampharos, to the Tree of Life.

Defeating Dark Matter and conclusion 
Celebi explains that the player might have been summoned once before by Mew and the Harmony Scarves protect its wearers from turning to stone when near the Tree of Life. Upon reaching the end of the forest, they find the Tree of Life near dead. They are confronted by Yveltal, Nuzleaf, and the remaining Beheeyem, whom Dark Matter has corrupted. They turn the escaped Beheeyem to stone and try to turn the group to stone as well, but the group are protected thanks to the harmony scarves. The group manage to defeat them and free them from their brainwashed state, but the battle allowed Dark Matter, who was inside the Tree of Life, to get the energy needed to pull the Tree out of the ground and send the planet toward the sun.

However, various flying Pokémon stall the ascent long enough for Arceus to send the player and partner into the Tree of Life. With help from Yveltal and the others, the two battle and destroy Dark Matter. The Society and Xerneas, the physical form of the Tree of Life, congratulate them, but the player soon becomes worried that they might be forced to leave the Pokémon world. When expressing their concerns to the partner, the partner informs them that, upon talking with Xerneas, they are the reincarnation of Mew and have to leave the world instead. The partner tells the player to not be upset before departing in a ball of light.

After story 
Some time later, the player has returned to working at the Expedition Society, but has lost motivation since their partner left. Ampharos advises the player to seek out a Pokémon named Xatu on the possibility of bringing back their partner. Upon reaching him, Xatu tells the player that Mew is living in a dungeon called Mystery Forest. However, the Mew the player finds is nothing like their partner. Initially returning home alone, the player discovers Mew following them and Ampharos brings him on to help the player with work. After several days of work, the player and Mew bond, allowing the player to get over the pain of their partner's departure. However, the player wakes up one day on the Serene Village hill with Mew gone and no memory of how they wound up there. After returning to the headquarters and not finding Mew there either, their memories come flooding back: Mew had gotten sick at some point and Xatu feared Dark Matter might be involved. Thinking the hill might help, the player took Mew there but was attacked by an unknown party upon arrival.

Immediately, Ampharos and Mawile come forward with a letter saying the individuals that took Mew were at Purifying Cave. At the depths of the cave, the player discovers the kidnappers were Nuzleaf and the Beheeyem, having learned of Dark Matter's presence in Mew and intending to destroy Mew before Dark Matter could revive. The player demands that Mew stays, as they can't bear losing another friend. The player's Harmony Scarf begins to glow and revives the partner. Ampharos, Mawile and Xatu then show up and explain that the partner was inside Mew and the kidnapping was a ruse to bring the partner back. Mew then returns home, and the player and partner resume their work.

Development
In April 2015, editors of Famitsu DS+Wii magazine stated that a new Pokémon game would be revealed the following month and that more details would come in a future issue. Pokémon Super Mystery Dungeon was later officially announced by The Pokémon Company and Nintendo via a press release on May 21, confirming the game's release for late 2015 in Japan and North America and early 2016 in Europe. Like previous entries in the Mystery Dungeon subseries, it was developed by Spike Chunsoft. Gameplay footage from the title was first showcased on a Nintendo Direct broadcast on May 31, 2015, along with a final Japanese release date.

Reception

The Japanese video game magazine Famitsu gave the game a score of 36/40 in their cross review, with the four individual reviewers all giving it a score of 9. It was the highest selling video game in Japan during its debut week, with 151,823 copies sold, and would go on to sell a total of approximately 295,598 copies in the region by the end of 2015. As of March 2016, it has sold approximately of 1.22 million copies worldwide.

Super Mystery Dungeon holds a score of 69/100 from the aggregate review website Metacritic, indicating mixed or average reviews. Reviewers praised the story, new mechanics, and inclusion of all 720 Pokémon, but criticized the repetitiveness of the combat and overall gameplay. Destructoid called it a "solid entry in the Pokémon franchise," commending its "tons of customization options" and "huge roster of potential allies and moves". Game Informer felt that the game was an improvement over previous entries in the Pokémon Mystery Dungeon series, and had a "better, more focused sense of humor", but that it still had issues such as overly-simplistic combat and repetitive gameplay, declaring that it "pales in comparison to the core RPG installments." Mitch Vogel of Nintendo Life similarly found it to be "tedious", elaborating that "Repetition that's present in nearly every aspect makes for a game that can sometimes feel like a chore rather than a form of entertainment". However, the editor ultimately felt that it would be a game for players who don't mind "grinding" recurrent scenarios and battles, stating "if you have the perseverance to stick with it long enough, you'll find that it pays off in the long run."

References

External links

2015 video games
Dungeon crawler video games
Nintendo 3DS games
Nintendo 3DS eShop games
Nintendo 3DS-only games
Nintendo Network games
Role-playing video games
Spike Chunsoft video games
Roguelike video games
Video games developed in Japan
Video games using procedural generation
Pokémon Mystery Dungeon
Lua (programming language)-scripted video games